Brzobohatý and Brzobohatá, the male and female forms of the same surname, may refer to:

 Miroslav Brzobohatý, Czech ice-hockey player
 Radoslav Brzobohatý (1932-2012) Czech actor
 Zuzana Brzobohatá, (born 1962) Czech politician

Czech-language surnames